Edward F. Lonergan is an American businessman.

Biography

Early life
Edward Lonergan graduated from Union College in Schenectady, New York in 1981, where he received a Bachelor of Arts degree in Political Science.

Career
From 1981 to 2002, he worked at Procter & Gamble. From May 2002 to December 2005, he served as President for the European region of The Gillette Company, a subsidiary of Procter & Gamble. From 2006 to 2011, he served as President and CEO of Diversey, Inc., a manufacturer of cleaning and hygiene products which became a subsidiary of Sealed Air in 2011.

From October 2012 to January 2015, he served as President and CEO of Chiquita Brands International, a publicly traded corporation which is the leading distributor of bananas in the United States. He replaced former CEO Fernando Aguirre.

Since August 2015, he has served as Chairman of Zep, Inc., a New Mountain Capital company. He also serves on the Board of Directors of Commercial Markets Holdco and Owens Corning, the world's largest manufacturer of fiberglass.

Personal life
He is married with two adult children.

References

Union College (New York) alumni
American chief executives of food industry companies
Living people
Year of birth missing (living people)